Punjab Youth (also known as Chief Minister Youth Development Programme) is a youth development programme running by the Government of the Punjab, Pakistan. Its chairman is CM Shahbaz Sharif.

Programmes 
The project distributes about 100,000 laptops annually to the graduate and undergraduate students currently studying in the government institutions in Punjab.

See also
 Punjab Youth Festival

References

External links 
 's official website

Organisations based in Lahore
Government of Punjab, Pakistan